Sievers School is a historic rural schoolhouse in Faulk County, South Dakota.  It was listed on the National Register of Historic Places in 2014.

References

Schools in South Dakota
Neoclassical architecture in South Dakota
School buildings completed in 1886
National Register of Historic Places in Faulk County, South Dakota
1886 establishments in Dakota Territory